Chlaenius aestivus is a species of beetle of the family Carabidae.

Description

C. aestivus is a large species of ground beetle. It has orange legs. It has an iridescent thorax and head, which is characteristic of the genus. The elytra, which are black, are imprinted with grooves, and the thorax is densely punctured.

Habitat

This species is often found under rocks, logs and other debris during the day. Moist areas, such as muddy bottomlands.

Identification

This species is distinguished from similar species by the antennae. Anntenomere 3 is longer than 1+2 and 4.

Eggs

Eggs are laid in mud cells attached to grasses.

References 

Beetles described in 1823